Mr. Freedom is a 1968 superhero film by the expatriate American photographer and filmmaker William Klein. An anti-imperialist satirical farce, it concerns the exploits of the titular white nationalist superhero and his sidekick, Marie-Madeleine (Delphine Seyrig), as they try to prevent a Communist takeover of France and solve the murder of a French superhero, Capitaine Formidable. In addition to Seyrig, the film features cameos by Donald Pleasence and Philippe Noiret, as well as the musician Serge Gainsbourg.

Plot summary
Mr. Freedom (John Abbey) is a Washington D.C. police officer who drinks Colt 45 on duty and moonlights as a government-sanctioned, vigilante superhero. After the 1968 Washington, D.C., riots, he is summoned to the Freedom Tower—an office building housing the U.S.'s most powerful companies- to meet with Dr. Freedom (Donald Pleasence), his handler, who informs him that another superhero, Capitaine Formidable, has been killed in France by operatives of the mysterious French Anti-Freedom (FAF) organization. Warning that this could be the first salvo in a Soviet invasion, Dr. Freedom dispatches Mr. Freedom to investigate his death and bring France back under the sway of western capitalist influences. As a last resort, Dr. Freedom equips him with "the big one," a portable nuclear device to destroy the country in the event that it falls to Communist influence.

In France, Mr. Freedom joins forces with Capitaine Formidable's wife, the femme fatale Marie-Madeleine (Delphine Seyrig), to lead his own anti-communist Freedom organization; Marie-Madeleine explains that she and Capitaine Formidable ran a string of state-sponsored brothels, using the money they earned to finance anti-Communist activities while also gathering intelligence on the various diplomats and politicians who use their services. Arriving at a pro-USA rally, Mr. Freedom delivers an extended speech extolling the virtues of democracy and capitalism while also espousing white nationalist sympathies and warning of the encroaching influence of African Americans (whom he calls "niggers"), Jews, Asians, and other "undesirables" on the national stage. Assembling an army from the attendees of the rally, he expresses his intention not only to secure France against Communist influence, but also build a "white wall of freedom" around the United States.

Mr. Freedom travels to the U.S. embassy (a supermarket) to meet with the American ambassador to France, who warns him of the influence that a pair of foreign superheroes—the Russian Stalinist Muzhik Man and Chinese Maoist Red China Man—have been exerting in the country. Mr. Freedom meets with his French counterpart, Super French Man (an inflatable), who expresses sympathies with their Communist ideologies, prompting Mr. Freedom to kill his sidekicks. Later he meets in a metro tunnel with Muzhik Man and Red China Man (the latter a giant, talking Chinese Dragon/lion dog (another inflatable)) and the three discuss the virtues of their various political ideologies; Muzhik Man makes friendly overtures to Mr. Freedom and disavows responsibility for the death of Capitaine Formidable. After he accidentally knocks himself unconscious, Muzhik Man takes Mr. Freedom back to Communist Party headquarters to recuperate; after waking up, Mr. Freedom kills Muzhik Man's girlfriend, Marie-Rouge.

Returning to Marie-Madeleine's apartment to have sex with her, Mr. Freedom suffers a crisis of conscience when her son calls him a fascist; he later realizes that his guilt is in fact coming from Red China Man, who is broadcasting subliminal messages to a radio receiver hidden in one of his teeth. After having the tooth removed, Mr. Freedom oversees the construction of a secret base from which his operatives can carry out anti-communist activities in France, and delivers a speech that works his followers into a violent frenzy, prompting them to begin looting, raping, and rioting. In response, the French begin holding anti-US demonstrations. Mr. Freedom opens fire into a crowd of peaceful protestors with a machine gun, to the horror of Marie-Madeleine, who subsequently reveals herself as an ally of Red Chinaman and a member of FAF. She further admits that she was the one who killed Capitaine Formidable. Mr. Freedom kills her, but FAF forces, demonstrators, and Mr. Muzhik's soldiers—seeking revenge for Marie-Rouge's death—breach his compound and kill the rest of his followers.

Resolving that France neither wants nor deserves American democracy, Mr. Freedom detonates "The Big One;" in a cutaway, Dr. Freedom admits that he really supplied Mr. Freedom with a "medium one;" the resultant explosion kills Mr. Freedom but leaves everyone else unharmed, and the French continue their anti-US rally.

Cast

Reception
Fearing it might never be seen otherwise, Klein showed the film at the 1968 Avignon Festival. Marxist-Leninist groups criticized the political caricatures of Red China Man and other characters.

References

External links
 
 
 

French avant-garde and experimental films
1969 films
1960s French-language films
1969 comedy films
French satirical films
Films directed by William Klein
Superhero comedy films
French superhero films
Film superheroes
1960s superhero films
Films scored by Serge Gainsbourg
1960s avant-garde and experimental films
1960s English-language films
1960s French films